Siege is a 1925 American silent drama film directed by Svend Gade and starring Virginia Valli, Eugene O'Brien, and Mary Alden.

Plot
As described in a film magazine review, a strong willed woman rules over her relatives and the town with an iron hand. She is the owner of a large industrial plant. No one has ever dared to oppose her until her son Kenyon appears with his wife Frederika. The wife is a modern young woman and just as dominent a personality, and she refuses to be cowed by her mother-in-law. a misunderstanding develops, but she is reconciled to her husband, and eventually she breaks the proud spirit of the older woman.

Cast

References

Bibliography
 Langman, Larry. Destination Hollywood: The Influence of Europeans on American Filmmaking. McFarland, 2000.

External links

Still at www.alamy.com (incorrectly states the film is British)

1925 films
1925 drama films
Silent American drama films
American silent feature films
1920s English-language films
Universal Pictures films
Films directed by Svend Gade
American black-and-white films
1920s American films